Cambria was a Welsh-American farming colony in Pennsylvania, founded during the 1790s by 50 immigrants from the village of Llanbrynmair on land purchased by Baptist minister Morgan John Rhys.

The settlement was given a Latin name meaning "Wales".

According to Marcus Tanner, Cambria is the first such Welsh-speaking community in the United States. Beginning in 1801, migrants from Cambria began to move West to found the Welsh-American settlement at Paddy's Run, which is now the site of Shandon, Ohio.

See also
Cambria County, Pennsylvania
Welsh Tract

References

History of Pennsylvania
Welsh-American culture in Pennsylvania